The second HMS Telemachus was a British submarine of the third group of the T class. She was built as P321 by Vickers Armstrong, Barrow, and launched on 19 June 1943. She served in Far Eastern waters for most of her wartime career, and was responsible for the sinking of the Japanese submarine I-166. Following the war she was deployed to Australia to operate with the Royal Australian Navy until 1959. She was scrapped in 1961.

Design and description
Telemachus was part of group three of the British T-class submarines. She was completed by builders Vickers Armstrong at their yard in Barrow in 1943.  She was named for Telemachus, a figure in Greek mythology; he was the son of Odysseus and Penelope, and an important character in Homer's Odyssey.

Service

Second World War
Although briefly deployed in British waters, Telemachus served in the Far East for much of her wartime career under the command of Bill King, arriving there to serve with the Eastern Fleet at Colombo in July 1944. Later in the same month on 17 July whilst on her first patrol in Far Eastern waters, she sank the Japanese submarine I-166 off the One Fathom Bank in the Strait of Malacca. An explosion was heard 94 seconds later from a single torpedo hit. I-166'''s commanding officer and a handful of other crew survived the sinking. After this patrol, she transferred to the 8th Submarine Flotilla, based at Fremantle, Western Australia. In October 1944 Telemachus dropped intelligence operatives into Japanese held Johore as part of Operation Carpenter.

Post-war
She survived the war and continued in service with the Navy. It was arranged for Telemachus to be one of three submarines to be based out of Sydney, Australia, to assist in the Royal Australian Navy's (RAN) anti-submarine training, owing to the decision to acquire the aircraft carrier HMAS Sydney. She left Britain on 19 October 1949 and arrived in Sydney in December that year, the first of the three submarines of the 4th Flotilla to arrive (the others being  and ). She was refitted at Singapore in late 1950, and again in 1952–1953, after which she spent several months based in Japan providing anti-submarine training for ships taking part in the Korean War.

In May 1954 she conducted operations with the Australian warships  and HMAS Vengeance, the New Zealand cruiser , and sister submarine HMS Thorough.

Between June and August 1956 she operated in conjunction with the RAN to conduct a hydrographic survey off the Australian Antarctic Territory. Whilst conducting these surveys, she went missing for two and a half hours on 3 June, resulting in an air and sea search being conducted until she resumed contact. After failing to report in as expected at 07:15, the naval authorities in Sydney issued the signal "subsunk" an hour later. Ship's crews were ordered to return to their vessels, and the Thorough was the first to get underway to search for Telemachus''. She again failed to report in as required at 09:45, but a Douglas C-47 Skytrain spotted the submarine before any other ships began to search for her, and the "subsunk" order was cancelled.

She returned to British waters on 9 December 1959, following nearly ten years of service in conjunction with the Australian Navy. She was scrapped at Charlestown on 28 August 1961.

References
Specific

General
 
 

 

British T-class submarines of the Royal Navy
Ships built in Barrow-in-Furness
1943 ships
World War II submarines of the United Kingdom
Cold War submarines of the United Kingdom